Barry Thomas (born 20 November 1956) is a New Zealand cricketer. He played in one first-class match for Canterbury in 1980/81.

See also
 List of Canterbury representative cricketers

References

External links
 

1956 births
Living people
New Zealand cricketers
Canterbury cricketers
Cricketers from Wellington City